In British folklore, the Beast of Exmoor, also known as the Exmoor Beast, is a phantom cat said to roam the fields of Exmoor in Devon and Somerset in the United Kingdom.

History

There have been numerous reports of eyewitness sightings; however, the official Exmoor National Park website lists the beast under "Traditions, Folklore, and Legends", and the BBC calls it "the famous-yet-elusive beast of Exmoor." Sightings were first reported in the 1970s, although it became notorious in 1983, when a South Molton farmer named Eric Ley claimed to have lost over 100 sheep in the space of three months, all of them apparently killed by violent throat injuries. There was even a report of the Beast seen "fishing" with its paw into the River Barle at Simonsbath, whilst some locals theorised that its lair might be in old mine workings on the Moor. The Daily Express offered a reward for the capture or slaying of the Beast. Farm animal deaths in the area have been sporadically blamed on the Beast ever since. Sightings were reported in the Devon and Somerset areas of England.

It has been suggested that the beast may possibly be a cougar or black leopard which was released from a private collection sometime in the 1960s or 1970s after a law was passed making it illegal for them to be kept in captivity outside zoos. However, considering that cougar and leopard life spans are 12–15 years, this is unlikely. In 2006 the British Big Cats Society reported that a skull found by a Devon farmer was that of a puma, however the Department for Environment, Food and Rural Affairs (DEFRA) states that "Based on the evidence, DEFRA does not believe that there are big cats living in the wild in England."

Characteristics
Eyewitness testimony has produced a number of different descriptions. Most accounts report the animal as being a large cat either resembling a puma or a panther. It is recorded as being somewhere between three and four feet six inches long from nose to tail and 2 feet six inches in shoulder height, standing very low to the ground, and as having the ability to leap over 6-foot-tall fences with ease. Descriptions of its coloration range from black to tan or dark grey, with white markings on its head and neck. It is described as having a squat head with a short neck, a muscular body, and short legs. Its pawprints are three to four inches across. It is described as nocturnal.

No such cat is native to England, and the variations in description have led some cryptozoologists to believe that there might be more than one creature.

Photographic evidence
Photographs have been produced on at least three occasions, one of which appeared in the West Somerset Free Press in 1989, taken by the Lewis Family of Blue Anchor, and all appear to show a big cat with the features of both a puma and a panther.

Explanations

Misidentification
Most observers and scientists believe that the sightings are merely of escaped domestic cats whose size has been greatly exaggerated, or else of large dogs that have been misidentified. The livestock deaths have often been attributed to these large dogs, although human attacks on the sheep have also been suspected.

Escaped pets
Although large cats are not native to England, some people have kept exotic animals, and in the mid 1970s this became something of a fad. It is inevitable that some have escaped over the years, and conceivable that they created a small group of big cats living hidden in the Exmoor area's countryside. In particular, the 1976 Dangerous Wild Animals Act, which controlled the keeping of big cats (among other things) led to the mass release of many privately owned wild cats.

Hybrids
According to the Exmoor zoo, "The Exmoor Beast is understood to be a melanistic leopard. These are a genetic mutation that exists in the wild."
Some descriptions of the Beast attribute it the features of both a puma and a leopard. Although these animals have been hybridized by Carl Hagenbeck in captivity, the offspring were always found to be dwarfed and short-lived; one such hybrid is preserved in the Zoological Museum at Tring. The name for such a hybrid is a Pumapard. Because male big cat hybrids are always sterile, a self-perpetuating race of puma-leopard hybrids is not possible.

Government involvement
In 1983, in response to increased reports of livestock death and sightings of the Beast, the Royal Marines staked out the Exmoor hills. Although some Marines claimed to have seen the Beast through night-vision equipment, no shots were fired, partially because of the risk of the Marines' high-powered sniper rifle bullets passing straight through the creature's body and then causing injury to humans or livestock etc., and the number of attacks on livestock dwindled.

During the search the Marines' commanding officer was quoted as saying that their quarry behaved with high, almost human, intelligence and "always moved with surrounding cover amongst hedges and woods". Ultimately, the Marines were recalled from the field, due to concerns they might mistakenly shoot one of several reward-seeking amateur photographers thought to be on the same hunt.

By 1987, the creature was connected to over 200 farm animal deaths. More recent attacks were reported in 1995 and 2001. The Ministry continued to study the reported sightings into the mid-1990s, before concluding that the Beast was either a hoax or myth and that the alleged sightings had been mistaken identifications of creatures native to the Exmoor area.

See also
 Beast of Bodmin
 British big cats
 Maltese tiger

Further reading

References

Cat folklore
English legendary creatures
Exmoor
Mythological felines